
Year 280 (CCLXXX) was a leap year starting on Thursday (link will display the full calendar) of the Julian calendar. At the time, it was known as the Year of the Consulship of Messalla and Gratus (or, less frequently, year 1033 Ab urbe condita). The denomination 280 for this year has been used since the early medieval period, when the Anno Domini calendar era became the prevalent method in Europe for naming years.

Events 
 By place 
 Roman Empire 
 Roman usurper Proculus starts a rebellion at Lugdunum (Lyon, France), and proclaims himself emperor.
 Emperor Probus drives the Alans off to Asia Minor and suppresses the revolt in Gaul; Proculus is executed.  
 The Germans destroy the Roman fleet on the Rhine; Bonosus is proclaimed emperor at Colonia Agrippina (Cologne). 
 Probus defeats the army under Bonosus. Bonosus sees no way out and hangs himself. His family is treated with honours.
 Julius Saturninus, governor of Syria, is in Alexandria, charged with the defense of the East. He is declared emperor and withdraws to Apamea. Probus besieges the city and puts him to death.  
 Roman territory is under constant threat of raids from Franks. The cities in Gaul are reinforced with defensive walls.

 Europe 
 The Thuringii, a Germanic tribe, appears in the Harz Mountains (Thuringia) of central Germania.

 China 
 Emperor Wu of the Jin dynasty completes the unification of China, which was previously divided between three contending powers during the Three Kingdoms period. The Jin dynasty's capital of Luoyang becomes a thriving centre of commerce as foreign diplomats and traders travel there.
 Persia 
 King Bahram II of the Sassanid Empire (Persia) sends envoys to seek peaceful relations with Rome.
 India 
 The Gupta Empire (India) is founded (approximate date).

Births 
 Saint George, Roman soldier and Christian martyr (approximate date)
 Yao Yizhong, Chinese general and warlord (d. 352)

Deaths 
 Bonosus, Roman general and usurper
 Cen Hun, Chinese official and politician
 Julius Saturninus, Roman usurper
 Kang Senghui, Chinese monk and translator
 Lu Jing, Chinese general and writer (b. 250)
 Maharaja Sri-Gupta of the Gupta Empire
 Yu Zhong (or Shifang), Chinese general
 Zhang Ti (or Juxian), Chinese chancellor

References